Group A of UEFA Euro 2004 was one of four groups in the final tournament's initial group stage. It began on 12 June and was completed on 20 June. The group consisted of hosts Portugal, Spain, Russia and Greece.

Portugal won the group and advanced to the quarter-finals, along with Greece. Spain and Russia failed to advance. Greece and Portugal faced each other again in the tournament final, with Greece again emerging victorious.

Teams

Notes

Standings

In the quarter-finals,
The winner of Group A, Portugal, advanced to play the runner-up of Group B, England.
The runner-up of Group A, Greece, advanced to play the winner of Group B, France.

Matches

Portugal vs Greece

Spain vs Russia

Greece vs Spain

Russia vs Portugal

Spain vs Portugal

Russia vs Greece

References

External links
UEFA Euro 2004 Group A

Group A
Russia at UEFA Euro 2004
Group
Portugal at UEFA Euro 2004
Greece at UEFA Euro 2004